Admiral Engel may refer to:

Arthur B. Engel (1914–1992), U.S. Coast Guard rear admiral
Benjamin F. Engel (1914–1983), U.S. Coast Guard vice admiral
Joan Marie Engel (born 1940), U.S. Navy rear admiral